Cuphonotus is a genus of flowering plants belonging to the family Brassicaceae.

Its native range is Australia.

Species:

Cuphonotus andraeanus 
Cuphonotus humistratus

References

Brassicaceae
Brassicaceae genera